Frederick James Carter is an English actor and director. He stars as Kaz Brekker in the Netflix fantasy series Shadow and Bone (2021–). He previously played Peter (Pin) Hawthorne in Free Rein (2017–2019), also on Netflix.

Early life and education
Carter was born on 27 January 1993 in Plymouth, Devon and grew up predominantly in Somerset. As his father was in the military, he spent some of his childhood moving around, with stints in Cyprus and Virginia Beach. His older brother is fellow actor Tom Austen; they also have a middle brother. The three of them went to school at Queen's College in Taunton. A production of Jerusalem starring Mark Rylance that Carter saw in London when he was 16 inspired him to pursue acting. He went on to train in acting at the Oxford School of Drama, graduating in 2015.

Career
Following graduation, Carter featured in the company of the Rose Theatre Kingston production of The Wars of the Roses directed by Trevor Nunn. Carter made his onscreen debut as a soldier in the 2017 DC Comics film, Wonder Woman. That same year, Carter landed his first major role as a main character Peter "Pin" Hawthorne in the Netflix series Free Rein. He also played this role in the Christmas and Valentine's specials. He starred as Alexander Flint in the 2018 stage production of Harley Granville-Barker's Agnes Colander in the Ustinov Studio at the Theatre Royal in Bath. Carter then played Ellis in 2018 horror film The Convent.

In 2019, Carter wrote and directed his first short film, No. 89. He also had a main role as Tom in the Channel 5 miniseries 15 Days and a recurring role as Jason Ripper in the American DC Comics series Pennyworth.

In October 2019, it was announced Carter would star as Kaz Brekker in the 2021 Netflix series Shadow and Bone, an adaptation of the fantasy book series The Grisha Trilogy and the Six of Crows Duology by Leigh Bardugo. Many publications singled out the Six of Crows half of the story for further praise, including Rolling Stone, Vulture, and CNET. He has upcoming roles in the Apple TV+ miniseries Masters of the Air and the Paramount+ adaptation of Elizabeth Macneal's The Doll Factory.

Personal life
Carter married Caroline Ford on 3 December 2022, having met on the set of Free Rein and been in a relationship since 2018. Carter does photography as a hobby. He is based in Marylebone, London.

Filmography

Stage

References

External links
 
 Freddy Carter at Spotlight

Living people
21st-century English male actors
Alumni of the Oxford School of Drama
English filmmakers
English male film actors
English male stage actors
English male television actors
Male actors from Plymouth, Devon
Male actors from Somerset
People educated at Queen's College, Taunton
People from Taunton